Dave Peabody (born David Peabody, 20 April 1948, Southall, Middlesex, London, England) is an English singer-songwriter, blues and folk musician, record producer and photographer, active since the late 1960s, who has appeared on more than 60 albums. He is primarily known for his acoustic guitar playing, in both bottleneck and fingerpicking styles.

Career
He first recorded in 1971 as a member of a group, Polly Flosskin, who recorded an album, Sailin' on the Ocean, and then as a member of a successor group, Tight Like That, on the Village Thing label. He also performed with early versions of Savoy Brown and Fleetwood Mac. His first, self-titled solo album was released in 1973. In all, he has released nine solo albums, the most recent being Side by Slide in 2005. He has also performed and recorded with a wide variety of other blues musicians, notably Charlie Musselwhite and Big Joe Duskin, as well as in a duo with Bob Hall, and has appeared at many blues festivals in the United States and Europe.

In 1996, he replaced Paul King in the King Earl Boogie Band. Peabody was voted "Acoustic Blues Artist of the Year" in 1995, 2001 and 2002.

Discography

Solo
Peabody Hotel (1973), The Village Thing
Keep It Clean (1974), Matchbox Records
Come and Get It (1976), Matchbox Records
Blues in Brussels (1977), CL Records
Payday (1979), Waterfront Records
Americana (1987), Waterfront Records
Hands Across the Sea (1993), Appaloosa Records
Down in Carolina (1997), Appaloosa Records
Side by Slide (2005), Appaloosa Records

With Bob Hall
Down the Road Apiece (1981), Appaloosa Records
Roll and Slide (1984), Appaloosa Records

With Brendan Power
Two Trains Running (2000), Indigo Records

With the King Earl Boogie Band
Loaded and Live (2009), Angel Air Records

With Colin Earl
Frets & Keys (2009), Valve Records

References

1948 births
Living people
English male singer-songwriters
English record producers
English folk musicians
English blues guitarists
English blues musicians
English folk guitarists
English male guitarists
Photographers from London
British harmonica players
English session musicians
British music journalists
Slide guitarists
Singers from London
People from Southall